Ryuichi Matsuda (July 8, 1920 – June 19, 1986) was a Japanese entomologist.

He obtained his PhD in entomology from Stanford University. He worked at the Biosystematics Research Institute of Canada.

He wrote several works on the comparative morphology of insects. He is most well known for his controversial book Animal Evolution in Changing Environments (1987).

He coined the term "pan-environmentalism" for his evolutionary theory which he saw as a fusion of Darwinism with neo-Lamarckism. He held that heterochrony is a main mechanism for evolutionary change and that novelty in evolution can be generated by genetic assimilation. His views were criticized by Arthur M. Shapiro for providing no solid evidence for his theory. Shapiro noted that "Matsuda himself accepts too much at face value and is prone to wish-fulfilling interpretation."

Interest in Matsuda's research was revived by Brian K. Hall, Gerd B. Müller and others in the volume Environment, Development, and Evolution: Toward a Synthesis (2004) which was a tribute to his ideas.

Publications

Morphology and Evolution of the Insect Head (1965)
Morphology and Evolution of the Insect Thorax (1970)
 Morphology and Evolution of the Insect Abdomen, with Special Reference to Developmental Patterns and their Bearings on Systematics (1976)
Animal Evolution in Changing Environments: With Special Reference to Abnormal Metamorphosis (1987)

Further reading
Brian K. Hall, Roy D. Pearson, Gerd B. Müller. (2004). Environment, Development, and Evolution: Toward a Synthesis. MIT Press.

References

1920 births
1986 deaths
Japanese entomologists
Lamarckism
Stanford University alumni
20th-century Japanese zoologists
Japanese expatriates in the United States